Mieszko Fortuński  (born 1 April 1992) is a Polish professional pool player. He was the winner of the Euro Tour event 2016 Italian Open. Fortuński is a three-time winner of the European Pool Championships, winning the ten-ball event in 2019, and the represented Poland in the team event, winning in 2015 and 2018.

Titles 
 Longoni 9-Ball League - with (Wojciech Szewczyk) (2023)
 Euro Tour
 Italian Open (2016)
 European Pool Championship
 Team (2015, 2018)
 Ten-Ball (2019, 2021)
 Polish Pool Championship
 Nine-Ball (2010, 2014, 2017)
 Ten-Ball (2014, 2019)
 Eight-Ball (2018)

External links 

 Mieszko Fortuński at Poland Billiards

References

1992 births
Polish pool players
Living people